Potanthus palnia, commonly known as the Palni dart, is a butterfly belonging to the family Hesperiidae found in India and Indochina.

References

Potanthus
Butterflies described in 1914
Butterflies of Asia
Butterflies of Indochina